Bae Hae-Min (born 25 April 1988) is a South Korean footballer. He currently plays as a midfielder for Goyang Hi FC in K League Challenge.

He began his club career in South Korea with K-League side FC Seoul. He made his debut in the Hauzen Cup, a league cup competition operated by the K-League, in May 2008 however he moved on loan to Czech Republic side FK Viktoria Žižkov later that year. Bae made his regular league debut for FC Seoul in May 2011 in a home game against Gyeongnam FC when he came on as a substitute. He would go on to make two further substitute appearances in the league as well as a start in the league cup competition that season before he left the club.

Bae signed for Korea National League side Daejeon KHNP for the 2012 season but spent just one year with the club. He signed for National League club Yongin City ahead of the 2014 season.

External links
 Plofile at fkvz.cz

1988 births
Living people
Association football midfielders
South Korean footballers
South Korean expatriate footballers
FC Seoul players
FK Viktoria Žižkov players
Goyang Zaicro FC players
K League 1 players
K League 2 players
Korea National League players
South Korean expatriate sportspeople in the Czech Republic
Expatriate footballers in the Czech Republic